The 2007 Austrian Open was the thirty-sixth edition of the Austrian Open and it took place from July 23–30, 2007.

Seeds

Draw

Key
WC - Wildcard
Q - Qualifier

Finals

Earlier rounds

Section 1

Section 2

Section 3

Section 4

External links
Singles draw
Qualifying draw

Singles